Gerasimos Tzakis (born September 17, 1966) is a Greek–Romanian professional basketball player.

Early life 
Tzakis was born in Bucharest to Greek parents.

Professional career
He started his career with Dinamo București. In 1987, he moved to PAOK. After one year, he joined to Apollon Patras in exchange for Bill Melis. One of Tzakis most memorable games, was a 109–91 victory against Olympiacos when Tzakis scored 19 points. Tzakis, stayed eight years to Apollon when he retired before the 1996–97 season. 

After his retirement he became a coach in amateur clubs such as E.A. Patras and Panachaiki G.E. He coached Titanes Patras, a wheelchair basketball  basketball club.

National team career
Tzakis was playing with the Romanian national basketball team. He participated in the 1992 Pre-Olympic Basketball Tournament. Tzakis retired from the national team in 1993.

References

External links 
at esake.gr
at fiba.com

1966 births
Living people
Apollon Patras B.C. players
Greek men's basketball players
Greek Basket League players
P.A.O.K. BC players
Point guards
Romanian men's basketball players
Romanian people of Greek descent
Basketball players from Bucharest